Implied Authority of Contract is a legal term incontract law, it is the implied ability of an individual to make a legally binding contract on behalf of an organization, by way of uniform or interaction with the public on behalf of that organization. When a person is wearing a uniform or nametag bearing the logo or trademark of a business or organization; or if that person is functioning in an obviously authorized capacity on behalf of a business or organization, that person carries an Implied Authority of Contract. An implied authority is authority that is not expressly granted by the contract, but that is assumed by the agent in order to have the ability to transact insurance business on behalf of the principal, regardless of what the contract specifically states.

Besides Implied Authority, there is Apparent Authority and Express Authority, these three being known as The Agency Relationship. In relation to companies, apparent authority is usually referred to as "ostensible authority".

References

Contract law